Brit Kirsti Kolle Grøndahl (born 1 September 1943) is a Norwegian politician for the Labour Party, former County Governor of Buskerud. She was Minister of Education and Church Affairs from 1986 to 1988 and Minister of International Development from 1988 to 1989.

From 11 October 1993 to 30 September 2001, she was the first female President of the Storting, and she has been County Governor of Buskerud since 1999.

References

Government ministers of Norway
County governors of Norway
Ministers of International Development of Norway
Members of the Storting
1943 births
Living people
Labour Party (Norway) politicians
Presidents of the Storting
Vice Presidents of the Storting
Women government ministers of Norway
20th-century Norwegian women politicians
21st-century Norwegian politicians
21st-century Norwegian women politicians
20th-century Norwegian politicians
Women members of the Storting
Ministers of Education of Norway